Mike Wiener is an American politician serving in the Minnesota House of Representatives since 2023. A member of the Republican Party of Minnesota, Wiener represents District 5B in central Minnesota, which includes the cities of Wadena and Long Prairie and parts of Cass, Morrison, Todd and Wadena Counties.

Early life, education and career 
Wiener attended St. Cloud Technical and Community College, earning a degree in sales and marketing. He previously served on the Todd County Planning and Zoning Board. Weiner raises Texas long horn beef cattle.

Minnesota House of Representatives 
Weiner was first elected to the Minnesota House of Representatives in 2022, after redistricting and the retirement of Republican incumbents John Poston and Steve Green who previously represented the area. Wiener serves on the Economic Development Finance and Policy Committee and the Taxes Committee.

Electoral history

Personal life 
Wiener lives in Long Prairie, Minnesota with his spouse and nine children.

References

External links 

Living people
Republican Party members of the Minnesota House of Representatives
21st-century American politicians
People from Long Prairie, Minnesota